Sparksville is an unincorporated community in Adair County, Kentucky, United States.  Its elevation is 1102 feet (336 m).  Its post office, which is no longer in operation, was named for Charles Weed Sparks, who is said to have established it on August 11, 1884; Sparks was later to establish and give his middle name to the nearby hamlet of Weed.

References

Unincorporated communities in Adair County, Kentucky
Unincorporated communities in Kentucky